.coop is a sponsored top-level domain (sTLD) in the Domain Name System of the Internet. It is intended for the use of cooperatives, their wholly owned subsidiaries, and other organizations that exist to promote or support cooperatives.

The  TLD was proposed by the National Cooperative Business Association (NCBA) as a response to the announcement by the Internet Corporation for Assigned Names and Numbers (ICANN) in late 2000 of a phased release of seven new generic top-level domains in an expansion of the Internet domain name space.

The proposal was backed by many cooperatives and similar trade groups around the world, including the International Cooperative Alliance (ICA). The technical infrastructure for the  TLD was developed by the worker cooperative Poptel in the United Kingdom and became operational on January 30, 2002.

The domain's sponsoring organization is DotCooperation LLC (also known as dotCoop), which is a wholly owned subsidiary of the National Cooperative Business Association (NCBA). DotCooperation is responsible for the TLD operation, including the enforcement of registration requirements. In 2005, the Midcounties Co-operative assumed operation of the domain registry through a subsidiary unit (Midcounties Co-operative Domains). DynDNS was contracted as the sole DNS provider for the registry in 2006.

Active  domains holders are automatically included in an online co-op directory and registrants receive a periodic newsletter. Registrations are processed via accredited ICANN domain name registrars or their resellers.

 domains are in use around the world, however, many co-ops, as businesses in the global community, also maintain domain names in other generic or country code top-level domains to identify themselves both as a co-op and as a business.

See also
 Domain name

References

External links
 IANA .coop WHOIS info
 .coop registry
 List of .coop accredited registrars

Sponsored top-level domains
Cooperatives
Computer-related introductions in 2001

sv:Toppdomän#Generiska toppdomäner